Sulari Gentill is an Australian author, also known under the pen name of S.D. Gentill. She initially studied astrophysics before becoming a corporate lawyer, but has since become a writer. Her novel Crossing The Lines won the 2018 Ned Kelly Award for Best Fiction. Crossing the Lines was published as After She Wrote Him in Northern America. Gentill's A Few Right Thinking Men was nominated for a 2011 Commonwealth Writers Prize.

Early life 
Gentill was born in Sri Lanka. Gentill was raised in Zambia and Brisbane, Australia.

Education 
Gentill started studying astrophysics, but ended up graduating in law.

Career 
Gentill was a corporate lawyer.

Gentill abandoned her legal career to write books instead of contracts. When the mood takes her, she paints, although she maintains that she does so only well enough to know that she should write.

She grows French black truffles on her farm in the foothills of the Snowy Mountains of NSW, which she shares with her young family and several animals.

Sulari is author of award-winning Rowland Sinclair Mysteries, a series of historical crime fiction novels set in the 1930s about Rowland Sinclair, the gentleman artist-cum-amateur-detective.

The 1st in the series A Few Right Thinking Men was shortlisted for Commonwealth Writers' Prize Best First Book. A Decline in Prophets, the 2nd in the series, won the Davitt Award for Best Adult Crime Fiction.  Miles Off Course was released in early 2012,  Paving the New Road was released in late 2012 and was shortlisted for the Davitt Award for best crime fiction 2013. Gentlemen Formerly Dressed was released in November 2013. All the Tears in China, the latest in the series, will be released early in 2019.

Under the name S.D. Gentill, Sulari also writes a fantasy adventure series called The Hero Trilogy.  All three books in the trilogy, Chasing Odysseus, Trying War and The Blood of Wolves are out now, and available in Paperback, in a trilogy pack, and as an eBook.

Bibliography

Rowland Sinclair series 
A Few Right Thinking Men (2010)
A Decline in Prophets(2011)
Miles Off Course (2012)
Paving the New Road (2012)
Gentlemen Formerly Dressed (2013)
A Murder Unmentioned: Rowland Sinclair (2014)
Give the Devil His Due (2015)
A Dangerous Language (2017)
All the Tears in China (2019)
A Testament of Character (2020)

Audio versions of The Rowland Sinclair Series are narrated by Rupert Degas.

The Hero Trilogy 
Chasing Odysseus (2011)
Trying War (2012)
The Blood of Wolves (2012)

Stand-alone novels 
 Crossing the Lines (2017) Poisoned Pen Press, 
After She Wrote Him (2020)
 The Woman in the Library (2022) Poisoned Pen Press

Personal life 
Gentill's husband is Michael. They have two children.

See also 
 Ned Kelly Awards

References

External links
 Official website
 Sulari Gentill — the story of the story behind 'A Decline in Prophets' on ABC Canberra

21st-century Australian women writers
Australian women novelists
Living people
Pseudonymous women writers
Year of birth missing (living people)
21st-century Australian novelists
Sri Lankan emigrants to Australia
21st-century pseudonymous writers
Women mystery writers
Detective fiction writers
Australian crime fiction writers
Australian crime writers
Australian mystery writers